Gabriel Bounin was a French author and dramaturgist of the 16th century. He was a lawyer of Châteauroux in Berry. In 1561, Gabriel Bounin published La Soltane, a tragedy highlighting the role of Roxelane (with no reliable sources or proof) in the execution of Şehzade Mustafa, the elder son of the Ottoman Sultan Suleiman the Magnificent. In defiance of the rules of the Pleiad, La Soltane was a play about a contemporary event, rather than a Classical one. This tragedy marks the first time the Ottomans were introduced on stage in France.

Works
 La Soltane
 Satyre au Roy contre les Republiquains

See also
Franco-Ottoman alliance

Notes

16th-century French dramatists and playwrights
1520 births
1604 deaths